Zurab Mikhailovich Agumava (born 1961) is the head of the Supreme Court and a former politician from Abkhazia.

Early life
Agumava was born in 1961 in the village of Eshera and was educated in the local school. In 1987, Agumava graduated in jurisprudence from the Abkhazian State University.

Career
Following his graduation, Agumava joined the Security Service. During the 1992–93 war with Georgia, he led counterintelligence on the Gumista front. Agumava was promoted first to deputy head in 1993 and then, after the end of the war in December 1993, head of military counterintelligence of Abkhazia. Between 1995 and May 1999, he held several senior posts in the Security Service and the Military Prosecution. In May 1999, Zurab Agumava was elected as a Supreme Court judge.

Interior Minister and Security Service Head
On 2 April Agumava was appointed Interior Minister by President Vladislav Ardzinba on 2 July 2001. On 1 November 2001, Agumava succeeded Raul Khajimba as Head of the State Security Service. On 2 April 2003, Agumava was appointed acting Head of the Sukhumi District, a post which he continued to hold until Ardzinba's successor Sergei Bagapsh appointed him Military Prosecutor in 2006.

Head of the Supreme Court
On 6 June 2014, Agumava was appointed acting Prosecutor General after the dismissal of Saferbei Mikanba following the 2014 Abkhazian political crisis. On 9 September, this appointment was extended by acting President Valeri Bganba until 7 October 2014, on which date Parliament elected Aleksei Lomia.

On 30 July, Agumava elected Head of the Supreme Court by Parliament, to succeed Roman Mushba who had announced his resignation, co-inciding with the end of his mandate.

References

Living people
Ministers for Internal Affairs of Abkhazia
1961 births
People from Sukhumi District
Chairmen of the State Security Service of Abkhazia
Heads of Sukhumi District